is a former Japanese football player.

Club statistics

References

External links

 Official blog 

1986 births
Living people
Association football people from Osaka Prefecture
Japanese footballers
J1 League players
J2 League players
Japan Football League players
Gamba Osaka players
Roasso Kumamoto players
V-Varen Nagasaki players
Association football midfielders